Mariam Omar may refer to:

 Mariam Omar (politician)
 Mariam Omar (synchronized swimmer)